The National Guard of Ukraine (NGU; ,) is the Ukrainian national gendarmerie and internal military force. It is part of the Ministry of Internal Affairs, responsible for public security. Originally created as an agency under the direct control of the Verkhovna Rada on 4 November 1991, following Ukrainian independence, it was later disbanded and merged into the Internal Troops of Ukraine in 2000 by then-President Leonid Kuchma as part of a "cost-saving" scheme. Following the 2014 Revolution of Dignity, amidst the Russian intervention, the National Guard was re-established, and the Internal Troops were disbanded.

The objective of the National Guard is to serve as a military unit with law enforcement powers. Its mission is to ensure state security, protect the state borders (supporting the State Border Service), participate in activities to neutralize paramilitary armed groups, terrorist organizations, organized groups and criminal organizations, protect critical infrastructure such as Ukraine's nuclear power plants, as well as diplomatic missions, and buildings of the Ministry of Internal Affairs. The NGU has sent personnel to UN peacekeeping missions. During peacetime the National Guard focuses on civilian public security, combating organized crime and controlling civil unrest. However, during wartime the National Guard can be mobilized as a regular military force and take part in combat operations alongside the Armed Forces of Ukraine, which it has done during the war in Donbas and the 2022 Russian invasion of Ukraine.

History

Original formation 
The NSU was originally created by the Law of Ukraine "On the National Guard of Ukraine" dated 4 November 1991, No. 1775 -XII. The National Guard was based on the Internal Troops of the Soviet Union in the Ukrainian SSR, the Internal Troops of Ukraine also was established at the same time in 1992 from the Ukrainian branch of the old Soviet Internal Troops. The National Guard claimed to inherit the traditions and legacy of the Gendarmerie of the Ukrainian People's Republic, which existed from 1918 to 1919.

During its early existence, the National Guard was indirectly involved in the Transnistria War of the Transnistria conflict during the spring and summer of 1992, helping to defend the border against a threatened spill-over of the conflict into Ukraine. Formations involved were the 3rd, 4th and 5th divisions NGU (equipment transferred from the 93rd Motorized Rifle Division was also used in this deployment). Afterwards, up until 1998, National Guard units backed up the border guards in anti-smuggling operations conducted on the border with Moldova and Moldova's breakaway Transnistria region. In 1994, the National Guard was also involved in the 1992-1994 Crimean Crisis, which was an attempted by the Autonomous Republic of Crimea to declare itself sovereign after the 1991 Crimean sovereignty referendum. The National Guard was sent to restore order and Ukrainian sovereignty over Crimea.

In 1995, there were already calls for the dissolution of the National Guard by political opponents of the then-president Leonid Kuchma who accused him of dictatorial behavior after he resubordinated the guard to himself by decree. After Kuchma's re-election after the 1999 Ukrainian presidential election, the opposition continued to demand the extinction of the National Guard, which was done in 2000 as part of a concession to the opposition by Kuchma and justified as part of a "cost-saving scheme".

The National Guard was dissolved by the Law of Ukraine "On Amendments and Additions to Certain Legislative Acts of Ukraine" dated 11 January 2000, and merged with the Internal Troops of Ukraine.

Badges of the NGU 1991–2000

Reformation
In 2014, amidst Russian intervention to Crimea, the reformed force was created partially on the basis of the Internal Troops of Ukraine, with plans for the "Volunteer Battalions", militias and armed wings from certain of Ukraine's political parties and organisations, including the Euromaidan movement, to be also incorporated into it. However, those plans have run into resistance from at least some of the latter, who do not wish to give up their weapons or otherwise subordinate themselves to government control. Direct recruitment from military academies was also intended. The National Guard was recreated in accordance with the Law of Ukraine "On the National Guard of Ukraine"  [Law number 4393] dated 12 March 2014, (the draft legislation being originally introduced to the Ukrainian parliament on 11 March). A previous attempt by then President Yushchenko to bring back the National Guard during civil unrest in 2008 had been blocked in the Rada. It was finally re-established in March 2014 after the beginning of the Crimean crisis. On 16 March, the Yatsenyuk Government announced plans to recruit 10,000 people within the next 15 days for the by now revived National Guard. Individual volunteers were also accepted.

The 2014 law provided for an initial authorised strength of 33,000 personnel. It also tasks the National Guard with maintaining public order, protecting sites like nuclear power plants and "upholding the constitutional order and restoring the activity of state bodies", in part a reference to the situation in Crimea, as well as to the perceived Russian threat to Ukraine as a whole. In the eastern parts of the country in particular, not only will the National Guard reinforce regular military units defending against a feared Russian invasion, it will also be expected to uphold Part 1 of Art. 109 of the Criminal Code of Ukraine  (i.e. it is intended to act as a counterinsurgency force against fifth columnists and infiltrators).

The National Guard will be receiving a large proportion of the money from the emergency budgetary reprogramming approved by parliament for the funding of weapons procurement, equipment repair, and training (said reprogramming is equivalent to $600 million in 2014 Dollars). It is hoped that, eventually, the strength of the National Guard will rise to 60,000 personnel. The pay for National Guard regulars is approximately 214 Euros ($297) a month, equivalent to an average Ukrainian's monthly income. Officers receive about twice that amount. There are also some attached Internal Troops personnel, mostly for training and/or logistical support purposes, 

e.g. K-9 teams that have been taking part in training and demonstration sessions.

During the ongoing war in the Donbas region of Ukraine, the forces of the revived National Guard have fought against pro-Russian separatists and Russian troops disguised as separatists. Due to lack of reserves, earlier in the conflict willing civilians and political groups created their own militias and paramilitary groups, known as the "Volunteer Battalions", to fight the separatists on their own. The Battalions were credited to have held the line against the separatists and allowed the National Guard and the Armed Forces to reorganize and strike back. Some of the Battalions were placed under the aegis of the Ministry of Internal Affairs Two of them were the Azov and Donbas battalions, which were the largest volunteer units by far with a strength of 1,000 and 900 soldiers. Due to the size and operational success of those Battalions, they were transferred to be under the command of the National Guard.

On May, the National Guard saw one of its first combat operations at the First Battle of Mariupol, where they clashed with pro-Russia militants and demonstrators during the unrest in Mariupol. They first attempted to occupy several government buildings before they were routed by National Guard riot troops, but soon the unrest evolved into heavy fighting between government and separatist militia forces. Around the same time on May, separatist troops captured the terminal buildings of Donetsk International Airport, the National Guard circled the separatist forces, issuing an ultimatum demanding the surrender of the separatists — which was denied — and the paratroopers launched an assault on the airport. The incident became known as the First Battle of Donetsk Airport. On the same month, National Guard Major General Serhiy Kulchytsky was killed during the Siege of Sloviansk, when his helicopter was shot down by separatists. On early June, a Border Guard base and a National Guard were besieged in Luhansk and after 10 hours of battle the base fell after the guardsmen ran out of ammunition.

On October 13, several National Guards troops protested outside the Ukrainian presidential administration building in Kyiv, they demanded the end of conscription and their own demobilisation. According to Kyiv Post, many of the protesters were former Internal Troops who had clashed with Euromaidan protesters, and they were not in favour of that movement or the new government.

Three National Guardsmen died in a riot on 31 August 2015 at the Verkhovna Rada when a policeman on leave threw a grenade outside the facade.

According to official figures, by mid-April 2016, the Interior Ministry and the National Guard have lost 308 personnel since the war in Donbas broke out, including 108 from the National Guard's volunteer battalions.

Russo-Ukrainian War 

Beginning Thursday, 24 February 2022, the day the Russian Armed Forces invaded Ukraine, the NGU has been active in many of the land battles fought by Ukrainian forces during the current war.

On the first day of the war, the Russian Airborne Forces (VDV) attempted an air assault on the Antonov Airport in Hostomel, northwest Kyiv, in order to do an air lift and bring more troops and heavier equipment to the capital in a military engagement that became known as the Battle of Antonov Airport. In the initial phases of the assault, the VDV expelled a small garrison of the National Guard and took control of the airport. However, the 4th Rapid Reaction Brigade of the Ukrainian National Guard swiftly reacted by launching an extensive counter-attack, using armored vehicles and artillery, that encircling the unsupported Russian troops and repelled the attack. The airport was captured by a renewed Russian offensive the next day, but the airport was rendered unusable by battle damage. The actions of the 4th Brigade were credited with preventing the quick capitulation of Kyiv, and led to the Russian Offensive on Kyiv stalling and eventually withdrawing.

169 National Guard troops were captured after the Battle of Chernobyl. Russian Ministry of Foreign Affairs claimed that "Currently, control over the situation at the Chernobyl NPP is being exercised jointly by Russian servicemen, Ukrainian specialists, the plant's civilian personnel, and that country's National Guard". But later reports indicated they were captured and locked in a bunker for 30 days. On 6 April, the Ukrainians officially announced the National Guard had retaken and reestablished control over the Chernobyl Nuclear Power Plant.

The Azov Regiment was heavily involved in the Siege of Mariupol, being one of the primary defenders of the city. The Azov's origins as a neonazi and ultranationalist militia, and its legitimization by the Ukrainian government and inclusion in the official structure of the National Guard has been a point of contention. It has been used by Russia to paint the Ukrainian government as Nazi-leaning, as justification for the brutality in Mariupol and as a casus belli for the invasion itself.

After the retreat of Russian forces from the Kyiv axis, the 4th Rapid Reaction Brigade was redeployed to the East Ukraine, to fight at the Eastern Ukraine offensive. In the east, unit was involved at the Battle of Severodonetsk and Lysychansk, where they fought a month-long defense of the twin cities. And later in the year, the unit was deployed at Bakhmut to fight in the grueling Battle of Bakhmut.

The National Guard began the raising of an additional 6 "Offensive Guard" Infantry Brigades in February 2023 to bolster its fighting forces under the recommendation of the Ministry of Internal Affairs, with the remaining two under other agencies. These brigades, unlike those under Army wartime control, report directly to NGU General Headquarters in Kyiv thru operational commanders. Under these circumstances, and with most of the former Azov Regiment veterans of Mariupol (by now released if living) and other battles now reporting under the Armed Forces' overall command, the regiment was reflagged and reactivated, this time, as a National Guard Offensive Infantry Brigade, organized in like manner as the rest of its fellow brigades.

Structure 
The National Guard of Ukraine is a military force under the command of Ukrainian Ministry of Internal Affairs, and is tasked to protect public order, strategically important facilities and counter illegal paramilitary groups. Ukrainian National Guard was originally formed in 1991, but disbanded due to financial issues and restored in 2014 after the Maidan revolution. During the martial law, the units of National Guard are subordinated to Ukrainian Armed Forces.

As of 2023 the National Guard is divided in five Operational-Territorial Commands:

 Central Administration, Dnipro, Dnipro Oblast
 Eastern Administration, Kharkiv, Kharkiv Oblast
 Northern Administration, Kyiv, Kyiv Oblast
 Southern Administration, Odesa, Odesa Oblast
 Western Administration, Lviv, Lviv Oblast

Volunteer Units 

 Azov Assault Brigade, Yurivka, Donetsk Oblast
 1st Company
 2nd Company
 3rd Company
 4th Company
 Donbas Battalion, Slavyansk, Donetsk Oblast
 1st Company
 2nd Company
 Detachment Dome
 Kruk Battalion, Ivano-Frankivsk, Ivano-frankivsk Oblast
 Kulchitskyi Battalion, Kyiv, Kyiv Oblast
 1st Company
 2nd Company
 3rd Company
 Dnipro-1 Battalion, Dnipro, Dnipro Oblast

Operational Brigades 

 Bureviy Brigade (Petro Doroshenko), Vyshorod, Kyiv Oblast
 1st Guardsmen Battalion
 2nd Guardsmen Battalion
 3rd Guardsmen Battalion
 Artillery Battalion
 Anti-Aircraft Defense Battalion
 Spartan Brigade (Petro Bolbochan), Kharkiv, Kharkiv Oblast
 1st Guardsmen Battalion
 2nd Guardsmen Battalion
 3rd Guardsmen Battalion
 4th Guardsmen Battalion
 Tank Company
 Artillery Battalion
 Anti-Aircraft Defense Battalion
 Reconnaissance Company
 Rubizh Brigade (Serhii Mikhalchuk), Hostomel, Kyiv Oblast
 1st Guardsmen Battalion
 2nd Guardsmen Battalion
 Svoboda Battalion
 Tank Company
 Artillery Battalion
 Anti-Aircraft Defense Battalion
 12th Operational Brigade, Mariupol, Donetsk Oblast
 Chervona Kalyna Brigade (Ivan Bohun), Kalynivka, Vinnytsia Oblast
 Kara-Dag Brigade (Oleksiyovych Zavada), Zaporizhzhia, Zaporizhzhia Oblast
 1st Guardsmen Battalion
 2nd Guardsmen Battalion
 3rd Guardsmen Battalion
 Tank Company
 Artillery Battalion
 Anti-Aircraft Defense Battalion
 Reconnaissance Company
 45th Operational Regiment, Lviv, Lviv Oblast
 Special Purpose unit Omega
 Special Intelligence Unit Ares
 Special Purpose unit Odesa

Protection of Public Order 

 11th Hrushevsky Brigade
 16th Radievsky Brigade
 19th Public Protection Regiment
 21st Kalnyshevsky Brigade
 23rd Khortytsia Brigade
 25th Prince Askold Brigade, Kyiv, Kyiv Oblast
 Special Honor Guard Battalion

Mixed Units 

 2nd Galician Brigade
 5th Slobozhansk Brigade
 11th Separate Battalion
 12th Separate Battalion
 13th Separate Battalion
 15th Slovyansk Regiment
 16th Separate Battalion
 18th Separate Battalion
 22nd Separate Battalion
 25th Separate Battalion
 26th Separate Battalion
 32nd Separate Battalion
 40th Nechay Regiment
 50th Vysochan Regiment
 75th Separate Battalion

Transport Protection Units 

 14th Separate Battalion
 15th Separate Battalion
 19th Separate Battalion
 27th Pechersk Brigade
 34th Separate Battalion

Commanders 
 1991–1995 Lieutenant General Volodymyr Kukharets
 1995–1996 Lieutenant General Oleksandr Kuzmuk
 1996–1998 Lieutenant General Ihor Valkiv
 1998–2000 Lieutenant General Oleksandr Chapovsky
 2000–2014 transferred to the Commander of Internal Troops
 2014 Lieutenant General Stepan Poltorak
 2014–2015 Lieutenant General Mykola Balan (acting)
 2015–2019 Colonel General Yurii Allerov
 2019–2022 Lieutenant General Mykola Balan
 2022– General Yuriy Lebid (acting)

Training

New recruits (those not transferring in from the Internal Troops, Ground Forces or military academies) will undergo an initial two-week compressed training course, covering a range of areas from firearms and unarmed combat, to map reading and communications. Those signing up to be full-time members of the Guard will receive at least an additional four weeks of training. For those part-time members who complete their two-week training and return to their communities to await call-up, the authorities appear to be planning to implement a variation of the March battalion system; based where possible around existing civilian militias and armed groupings. Most of those use the sotnya as their basic unit, as does the National Guard itself.

In March 2015, the National Guard of Ukraine received training from the U.S. 173rd Airborne Brigade Combat Team. The training took place at the Yavoriv training center near the western Ukrainian city of Lviv. The 173rd Airborne paratroopers trained the Ukrainians on how to better defend themselves against "Russian and rebel artillery and rockets." Training also included securing roads, bridges, and other infrastructure and treating and evacuating casualties.

Officers and NCOs of the NGU are trained under the aegis of the National Guard Military Academy of Ukraine.

Ranks and insignia 
 Officers

Other Ranks and NCOs

Long Service Medal

Equipment

Gallery

See also
Military aid to the civil power
Novi Petrivtsi – Location of one of the training bases for the National Guard
Politics of Ukraine
Territorial defence battalions (Ukraine)
National Guard of Russia
National Gendarmerie of France

Notes

References

External links and further reading
 
 
 National Guard recruitment webpage, operated by the Ministry of Internal Affairs (In Ukrainian). Accessed 29 March 2014.
 Spetsnaz NGU. Unofficial website.
 Taras Kuzio, "The non‐military security forces of Ukraine." The Journal of Slavic Military Studies 13, no. 4 (2000): 29–56.

 
Military of Ukraine
Law enforcement agencies of Ukraine
Counterinsurgency organizations
Emergency management in Ukraine
1991 establishments in Ukraine
Military units and formations established in 1991
Military units and formations disestablished in 2000
2000 disestablishments in Ukraine
2014 establishments in Ukraine
Military units and formations established in 2014
2014 pro-Russian unrest in Ukraine
War in Donbas
Institutions with the title of National in Ukraine
Ukraine